Dhangadhimai Municipality is a municipality in Siraha District in Madhesh Province  of eastern Nepal. After the government announcement the municipality was established on 19 September 2015 by merging the existing Bhawanipur, Hanuman Nagar, Phulkaha Kati, Dhangadi and Bishnupurkati village development committees (VDCs). The center of the municipality is established in Dhangadhi Bazaar. At the time of the 2011 Nepal census after merging the four VDCs population it had a total population of 47,449 persons. After the government decision the number of municipalities has reached 217 in Nepal.

References

External links
UN map of the municipalities of  Siraha District

Populated places in Siraha District
Nepal municipalities established in 2015
Municipalities in Madhesh Province